Burchardztwo  (Cashubian Bùrchardztwò) It lies approximately  south-east of Kartuzy and  west of the regional capital Gdańsk.

For details of the history of the region, see History of Pomerania.

The village has a population of 212.

References

Burchardztwo